The Easter Week 2006 tornado outbreak sequence was a tornado outbreak sequence during the days leading up to Easter, continuing into the week after the holiday. It was the third major outbreak of April 2006, which had been an unusually busy month for tornado activity.

Meteorological synopsis
 
On April 13, a complex of severe thunderstorms formed in eastern Iowa, bringing many reports of large hail along with unexpected reports of strong tornadoes, some with debris. The worst impacts were felt in the Iowa City area, where significant damage and numerous injuries were reported, in addition to at least one death across the region.

Another supercell developed on April 14 across western Indiana, producing a few tornadoes; although, nothing very serious was actually reported. That system moved eastward over the Mid-Atlantic States on April 15, but no tornadoes were reported there.

While the first system moved eastward, a second system developed over the Upper Midwest and tracked across the Midwest between April 15 and 16. This new system produced 40 reported tornadoes, several of which have been damaging; however, no fatalities were reported from the second system.

That system then tracked into the Mid-Atlantic on April 17 and was mostly a straight-line wind event, even though there were a handful of new tornadoes reported across the region.

A third system developed on April 18 and brought even more severe weather, this time farther south in the lower Midwest, primarily in Missouri. There were several more tornadoes reported from this one.

The severe weather activity finally ended on April 19 across the South.

The back side of this system produced heavy snow and blizzard conditions over the High Plains.

Reported tornadoes

April 13 event

April 14 event

April 15 event

April 16 event

April 17 event

April 18 event

Iowa City, Iowa

 
The most well-known tornado of the outbreak was a destructive high-end F2 that tore directly through downtown Iowa City shortly after dark. The tornado touched down at the southwest edge of town and moved northeast, downing power lines and striking the Sheriff's Office. The tornado then struck the University of Iowa campus, heavily damaging multiple buildings and temporarily trapping several students. The motor pool headquarters was a total loss. Just off campus, the Alpha Chi Omega sorority house was also severely damaged, and had to be evacuated following the event. As the tornado struck the downtown area, multiple historic brick buildings sustained collapse of walls or had their roofs torn off. Saint Patrick's Church was heavily damaged by the tornado. Just before the tornado hit, Reverend Rudolph Juarez ushered 50 to 75 parishioners (many elderly) to the safety of the rectory basement next door. This likely saved many lives, as the tornado tore off the roof of the church and collapsed the top portion of the brick facade and the steeple into the main congregation area. Residential sections of the city also sustained major damage, as many trees and power lines were downed, and 1,016 homes and apartment buildings were damaged. Upper portions of exterior walls failed at some of these residences. Elsewhere,  a 53-year-old Dairy Queen was destroyed, multiple vehicles were flipped, a Wal-Mart sustained roof damage, and a gas station awning was blown over. Three automobile dealerships were also damaged; one dealership had 200 vehicles damaged, a second had 60-70 vehicles damaged, and a third had nearly every vehicle sustaining some type of damage. A total of 35 businesses were damaged or destroyed. The tornado dissipated as it exited at the northeast side of town.

The tornado struck on a Thursday night, which is normally a busy time for the bars of downtown Iowa City. Fortunately, the tornado struck relatively early in the evening, and downtown was not as packed as it might have been had the tornado struck a few hours later. There were a few reports of looting, mainly at establishments where liquor was sold/stored. The Iowa National Guard was called in to restore order and assist with debris cleanup. Electricity was cut to about 7,000 customers in the area, but most power was quickly restored after the tornado. This was the only known tornado to have struck downtown Iowa City. Overall, 30 people were injured in the event.

Impact
UI President David Skorton canceled classes as a result of the tornado. on Friday, April 14.  On Friday, area governments declared a joint state of emergency for Johnson County  The Daily Iowan (the University newspaper) continued coverage through the weekend, days on which the newspaper does not traditionally print.

See also
List of North American tornadoes and tornado outbreaks
Tornadoes of 2006

References

External links
 1,181 Photos of the Iowa City April 13th tornado damage (University of Iowa) -Image Gallery, Picture of actual tornado over downtown, etc.
 University of Iowa release page - includes news releases, image galleries and statements
 National Weather Service overview
 Photos and videos of tornadoes and damage (Iowa State University)

F2 tornadoes
Tornadoes of 2006
Tornadoes in Illinois
Tornadoes in Iowa
Iowa City, Iowa
2006 natural disasters in the United States
April 2006 events in the United States